Umivik Bay, also known as Umiivik and Umerik,  is a bay in King Frederick VI Coast, southeastern Greenland. It is part of the Sermersooq municipality.

Unlike the jagged and forbidding appearance of most fjord systems in East Greenland, the Umivik area has a relatively gentle shape. Here the massive Greenland ice sheet comes down to the shore in smooth, even undulations and the landscape looks unbroken, with only few glimpses of bare rock. Owing to this smoothness, Umivik Bay was chosen as launching point for westward overland crossings, including the pioneering 1888 Greenland venture by Fridtjof Nansen.

Geography
{ "type": "ExternalData", "service": "geoshape", "ids": "Q23975063", "properties": { "fill": "#0050d0"}}

Umivik Bay is located between the Fridtjof Nansen Peninsula to the north and the Odinland Peninsula to the south. It includes a sound and a fjord and has a few large islands, the largest of which is Upernattivik (Upernarsuak) lying squarely in the middle of the inner part of the bay. Other significant islands in the bay are Trefoldigheden, Terne Island and Tre Lover in the inner bay, as well as Pikiitsi further east off the shore. The innermost part of the bay, by the terminus of the glaciers is known as Qíngua.

At the bay's northeastern end there is the small Jensen Bay, as well as numerous islets and rocks with intricate channels.

Umiiviip Kangertiva (Gyldenløve Fjord), was named after Hans Ulrik Gyldenløve by Lieutenant W. A. Graah in 1829. It is located on the southern side of the bay, between Upernattivik and the mainland shore; Vikingevig is a small bay in the fjord, in the northern shore of Odinland. 
Umivik Bay's mouth is located between Cape Colberger Heide and Cape Lovelorn in the Denmark Strait area of the Atlantic Ocean.

History
There are two Paleo-Eskimo archaeological sites near the entrance to Umivik Bay on the northeastern side; one on the mainland shore and the other in the Garner Islands.

Until recent times Inuit visited the area during hunting trips. Fridjof Nansen wrote: 

Nansen's expedition left sealer Jason near Sermilik Fjord, where Nansen had initially decided to start the crossing. However, there followed days of extreme frustration for the party as, prevented by weather and sea conditions from reaching the shore, they drifted southwards with the ice. Most of this time was spent camping on the ice itself—it was too dangerous to launch the boats. On that day they finally reached land, but were too far south to begin the crossing. After a brief rest, Nansen ordered the team back into the boats and to begin rowing north.

During the next 12 days the party battled northward along the coast through the ice floes. On the first day they encountered a large Eskimo encampment near Cape Steen Bille, and there were further occasional contacts with the nomadic native population as the journey continued. After landing at Umivik, they spent the next four days preparing for their journey, and on the evening of 15 August they set out.

See also
Fridtjof Nansen: The Crossing of Greenland
List of fjords of Greenland
Søren Norby Islands

Bibliography
Bjarne Grønnow, Jens Fog Jensen (2003). The Northernmost Ruins of the Globe. Museum Tusculanum Press. 
  (First published in 1997 by Gerald Duckworth)
 Tr. as Eskimo Life, 1893.

References

External links

Picture of Umivik Bay, Greenland
The British Arctic Air Route Expedition.

Bays of Greenland